This is a list of historic places in the province of Newfoundland and Labrador entered on the Canadian Register of Historic Places, whether they are federal, provincial, or municipal.  For reasons of length, the list has been divided as follows:
 St. John's
 Avalon Peninsula except St. John's
 Labrador
 Western Newfoundland
 Central Newfoundland
 Bonavista Bay region

See also

 List of National Historic Sites of Canada in Newfoundland and Labrador